VF1, or similar, may refer to:
 VF-1, a deactivated fighter squadron of the United States Navy
 VF-1 Valkyrie, a fictional aircraft in the Macross and Robotech series
 Virtua Fighter (video game), a 1993 fighting game
 NaV1.5, an alias VF1